Ayoade may refer to:

 Ayoade Ademola Adeseun (born 1953), Nigerian politician
 Richard Ayoade (born 1977), English actor and writer